Southgate Thomas J. Anderson High School is a public high school in Southgate, Michigan, United States. A part of the Southgate Community School District, it serves Southgate and a section of Allen Park.

History 

Southgate, Michigan formerly had two high schools in the city, Southgate High School and Schafer High School.

After the 1981-82 school year, the Heintzen and McCann school districts consolidated into one called Southgate Community School District. Schafer High School closed and combined operations with Southgate High School, which was renamed Southgate Anderson High School that summer by the school board. The new name was in honor of Thomas J. Anderson, the first mayor of Southgate. On September 8, 1982 Southgate Anderson High School reopened its doors with approximately 1,400 students.

From 1982 to 2013, Southgate Anderson only held grades 10-12 while Davidson Middle School held Freshman. In September 2013, Southgate Anderson once again held grades 9-12.

Demographics
The demographic breakdown of the 1,363 students enrolled in 2014-15 was:
Male - 50.9%
Female - 49.1%
Native American/Alaskan - 0.8%
Asian/Pacific islanders - 0.7%
Black - 9.0%
Hispanic - 9.8%
White - 79.4%
Multiracial - 0.3%

37.6% of the students were eligible for free or reduced lunch.

Notable alumni
Jeff Jones- Former pitcher for Oakland A's and former Detroit Tigers Pitching Coach
Rick Down- Former Minor League Baseball player and former MLB hitting coach

References

External links
Official website

1957 establishments in Michigan
Educational institutions established in 1957
Public high schools in Michigan
Schools in Wayne County, Michigan
Southgate, Michigan